The Haunting of Sarah Hardy is a 1989 American made-for-television horror film directed by Jerry London and starring Sela Ward, Morgan Fairchild, Roscoe Born, Michael Woods, and Polly Bergen. The film aired on the USA Network on May 31, 1989.

Cast
Sela Ward as Sarah Hardy
Roscoe Born as Allen deVineyn
Polly Bergen as Emily Stepford
Morgan Fairchild as Lucy
Michael Woods as Austin Hardy
Charles Bernard as Uncle Neddy
Vana O'Brien as Aunt Caroline

Production
Filming took place in Portland, Oregon, at the Pittock Mansion.

Release
The Haunting of Sarah hardy was distributed on home video by CIC in the United Kingdom in December 1989.

Critical response
Irv Letofsky of the Los Angeles Times wrote of the film: "The thing about suspense is that the characters can be dumb and the plot can be muddled and the whole production can be awkwardly filmed and sometimes it can still work. But if there's no passion in the playing and it all lies there flat and deadly and every twist and turn of the story is predictable by a mile, then there's not much fun and surprise left."

John Stark of People wrote: "The hokey plot, with its ending right out of When a Stranger Calls, could be excused if the characters weren’t so one-dimensional. There’s no sense of locale, either. Although filmed in and around Portland, Ore., it could be Anywhere, U.S.A. There is one old-fashioned quality we can be thankful for: It isn’t violent."

References

External links

1989 television films
1989 films
1989 horror films
American supernatural horror films
Films directed by Jerry London
Films shot in Portland, Oregon
American horror television films
USA Network original films
1980s supernatural horror films
1980s American films